In 1998 net official foreign aid to Eritrea was US$135.8 million; in 2002 it reached US$217.6 million. The government of Eritrea prefers private-sector investment to official aid programs, and its relations with aid-dispensing nations and international institutions have often been difficult. In 2020 Eritrea’s aid has reached  $680 million per year.

References 

Eritrea
Foreign relations of Eritrea
Economy of Eritrea
Eritrea